Wienpietschseen is a group of lakes in Mecklenburgische Seenplatte, Mecklenburg-Vorpommern, Germany. At an elevation of 62.5 m, its surface area is 0.025 km².

Lakes of Mecklenburg-Western Pomerania
Waren (Müritz)